The Regional State Administrative Agency for Western and Inland Finland is one of the six Regional State Administrative Agencies in Finland. The responsibility area of the agency is composed of five regions, 25 districts and 115 municipalities.

Regions

References 

Western Finland Province